Robert's Robots is a British children's television show that ran from 1973–1974 on ITV.  Robert Sommerby is the inventor of the robots, and he lives with Aunt Millie.

Cast
The cast included John Clive, Nigel Pegram, Sylvester McCoy, Christopher Biggins and Jenny Hanley.

Episodes

Series one
 "Follow That Robot" 12 November 1973
 "Love at First Light"  19 November 1973
 "A Spanner in the Works" 26 November 1973
 "Dial C for Chaos" 3 December 1973
 "A Long, Cold Sommerby" 10 December 1973
 "Kill or Cure" 17 December 1973
 "Double Trouble" 24 December 1973

Series two
 "One of Our Robots Is Missing", 11 November 1974
 "A Full Head of Steam", 18 November 1974
 "I Spy with My Little Ear", 25 November 1974
 "Courting Disaster", 2 December 1974
 "Gastronomics Anonymous", 9 December 1974
 "Rampaging Robots", 16 December 1974
 "Santa Claus-Trophobia", 23 December 1974

References

External links
 
 
 Excerpt from episode 4 "Dial C for Chaos"

1970s British children's television series
1970s British science fiction television series
1973 British television series debuts
1974 British television series endings
English-language television shows
ITV children's television shows